The Love of the Maharaja is a 1936 German drama film directed by Arthur Maria Rabenalt and starring Gustav Diessl, Attila Hörbiger and Hilde von Stolz.</ref> It was made as a co-production between the Italian Astra Film and the Munich-based Bavaria Film. A separate Italian version A Woman Between Two Worlds was also produced.

It was shot at the Cines Studios in Rome. The film's sets were designed by the art director Hans Ledersteger.

Cast
Gustav Diessl as Maharadscha
Attila Hörbiger as Dr. Lawburn
Hilde von Stolz as Daisy Atkins
Isa Miranda as Mira Salviati
Váša Příhoda as Stefan Claudius
Anton Pointner as Trenchman
Marjan Lex as Uschi as Zofe
Rudolf Carl as Ferdl
Hans Loibner as Xaver
Robert Valberg as Lord Winston
Mihail Xantho as Hotel director

References

External links

1936 drama films
German drama films
Films of Nazi Germany
Films directed by Arthur Maria Rabenalt
Bavaria Film films
Cines Studios films
Films based on German novels
German multilingual films
German black-and-white films
1936 multilingual films
Films set in India
Cultural depictions of Indian monarchs
1930s German films